LunaJets is a private jet broker with headquarters in Geneva, Switzerland, where it has been based since it was founded in 2007 by former Ogilvy advertiser Eymeric Segard. Additionally, they have opened offices throughout the years in London, Paris, Monaco, Riga and Dubai.

It is privately owned by two of the founders.

As an online broker, the company does not own any aircraft, but rather matches operators and private jet owners with end user private jet clients to provide on-demand shorter flights and empty leg flight services. Over the years, LunaJets has developed a global network of 350 operators and access to 4,800 aircraft. LunaJets, therefore, has access to all categories of aircraft, both turboprop and jet-powered, ranging in size from Very Light Jets, such as the Cessna Citation Mustang, to VIP Airliners, such as Boeing Business Jets (BBJs) and Airbus Corporate Jets (ACJs).

History

2000s 
LunaJets was founded in December 2007 by Eymeric Segard, the company's acting CEO, after raising $US2million from private investors. The initial concept was to create an online platform to provide "empty leg flights", and last minute “empty seats” on private planes flying empty at a discount from market price. ‘Empty legs’, also called in the industry as “deadhead,” “positioning, “or “ferry flights,” are planes flying without any passengers due to the need to reposition or return to their home base, among other reasons. They can be available at a discount of up to 75% of regular prices. At the time, entrepreneur Richard Branson launched a similar concept named "Virgin Charter" with entrepreneur Scott Duffy, but for Lunajets, the concept of jet sharing and the resale of private jet seats did not work. Virgin Charter, who at the time employed 100 people, stopped its operation in 2009 when private jet charter dropped dramatically due to the financial crisis. LunaJets however had sold its first empty leg seat by July 2008, shortly after Eymeric Segard had created LunaJets. The same year they developed their online booking platform with proprietary technology. In 2009 they launched their website branding itself as high tech, full service and low commission on demand private jet charter flights.

2010s 
In 2010, LunaJets rebranded itself as a low-cost provider of private jet charter flights under the “fly private at the best price” slogan, offering on-demand charter flights and empty legs, and additionally opened up a new office in Hungary. In October 2014, Lunajets launched the third version of its website. In May 2015, LunaJets introduced the first version of their mobile application (available on iOS, RiM and Android) presented by CNBC as the Uber of private aviation. As of 2015, LunaJets opened a regional office inside the Private Jet Terminal in Olbia, Italy and in Dubai and a new office in Ibiza. At that time, they had expanded to around 25 employees. In 2017, the company topped 40 employees, counting 20 nationalities and 12 languages. LunaJets reached 60 million Swiss francs in annual sales in 2018, representing an increase of 40% over 2017. Additionally in 2018, the company organised close to 5,000 flights, up 35% versus the previous year. In 2018, LunaJets got awarded best employer of the year by the economic magazine Bilan. In 2010 they sold around 550 seats with around 10 employees, which by 2019 had already gone up to 6,000 flights and 50 employees.

2020s 
In 2021, LunaJets reached the milestone of more than 100 million swiss francs in annual sales, over 8000 flights organised, and 60 employees spread in 6 key offices: Geneva, Paris, London, Riga, Monaco and Dubai. 2021 has been a record year for LunaJets in every way. They have reached their record in Volume flights, with a record number of over 1’100 new clients covering long range flights in all continents. In 2021 LunaJets also opened the new Monaco office and relaunched the London office. That same year in August LunaJets operated emergency charter flights out of Kabul. Currently LunaJets is the leader in jet charter services of the European Market and has won for 4 consecutive years the best employer award by Bilan. Lunajets participates yearly in the European Business Aviation Convention and Exhibition in Geneva, happening from the 23rd May – 25th of May this year. EBACE is the place to experience new and future-forward aviation technologies. 2022 is the strongest year for LunaJets so far with new clients and most importantly new offices. With over 12000 movements and 1250 new clients, LunaJets exceeded 150 million swiss francs in 2022 representing a 40% YoY increase. Besides the massive growth in LunaJets, LunaGroup Charter the sister company also reported a 290% YoY increase. 2023 started strong, with the inauguration of the new office in Dubai in February 2023, the first office outside Europe, and forecasting upcoming new offices in Zurich and Madrid for 2023. Luna Aviation Group has over the past two years expanded to London, Paris, Riga, and Monaco.

Certifications and Associations 
LunaJets has ARGUS certification. The ARGUS certification is the industries most respected symbol for excellence.

In 2015, it was the first charter broker to obtain this certification outside the U.S.A  after an in depth in-house audit, now repeated every 2 years.

The Swiss financial magazine Bilan recognized LunaJets at the “Best Employer in Switzerland” for start-ups under 100 employees. LunaJets received the award for the fourth time in 2021, reiterating the feat of the preceding years.

LunaJets is a member of the European Business Aviation Association (EBAA) and the U.S. National Business Aviation Association (NBAA).

LunaJets belongs to The Air Charter Association as an ARGUS certified broker member. ARGUS is designed to promote higher levels of safety and customer service. They offer aviation consulting, global audit standards and aviation analytics. Lunajets is proud to be certified by ARGUS and thrives excellence in every way.

Sponsorship
Since 2011, LunaJets has been the official sponsor of the Aleph sailing. In 2014 Lunajets became a partner of the Womanity Foundation. In Summer 2016, LunaJets sponsored the Stile F - Squadra Corse team in the Blancpain GT Series Cup, an annual race at the Circuit Paul Ricard in Le Castellet.

In 2017, LunaJets announced its support toward World Bicycle Relief as part of their Corporate Social Responsibility program.

Since 2017, LunaJets has sponsored an Easy to Fly named Luna, a foil catamaran. In 2018, Luna was the first Easy to Fly to cross the finish line in the lake Geneva race, Bol d'Or Mirabeau.

In 2018, LunaJets announced their sponsorship of Alan Roura's sailing and racing journeys for the next three years on board the foiling multihull, La Fabrique.

2022 saw the new sponsorship of Scuderia Monte Carlo in the new Ferrari challenge with Europe and the support of the Eden foundation in support of an orphanage and a school in Cotonou, Benin. William van der Vorm, the Ferrari Challenger driver is now on his 3rd season and LunaJets will support Willem in his defence for the title in the upcoming 2022 championship.

Subsidiaries 
LunaJets belongs to the Luna Aviation Group. Within the group, there is LunaSolutions, specializing in aircraft sales and acquisitions, LunaGroup Charter for larger groups of passengers and LunaLogistik specializing in cargo and emergency charters. 

LunaGroup charter does similarly to LunaJets operate under the same core principles, flexibility, transparency, reactivity and neutrality. They are dedicated to sourcing the best aircraft solution for groups at anytime and anywhere. They tailor all charter requirements for the group. In February 2022, Luna Group Charter broke the record of over 5500 passengers flying on the same day for the Six Nations Rugby Championship.

LunaSolutions, founded in 2020, offers an independent, customer centric and personalized service to all those who wish to sell or trade private jets. These may include private, corporate clients or governments. Their aim is to give them the right and individualized consultancy service for them to acquire or sell private jets. Their main offices are located in Geneva, London and Paris Lunasolutions has very skilled and experienced employees and thanks to Lunajets, Lunasolutions has a wide range of data gathered for more than a decade. This way Lunasolutions can estimate the real history of each aircraft and give better advice to their clients.

LunaLogistik is dedicated to help private and corporate clients with the service to transport goods and ship them by air. These goods may include precious art, important documents, dangerous goods or any large and heavy cargo. The main offices are located in Geneva and London.

The Overall vision for Luna Aviation group is to support their clients in the best possible way by building relationships based on trust creating a loyal and satisfied customer base.

Business Model 
“At anytime from anywhere”. As an online broker, Lunajets business model is based on chartering private jets with the best available prices in the market offering jet charter solutions. They connect jet owners with end user private jet clients. The best prices are achieved through purchasing power and independent advice by the team’s proprietary technology. LunaJets is simple, fast and reliable providing a 24/7 worldwide service and ensuring the best outcome possible for the client’s satisfaction.

Fleet 
Beechcraft King Air 90GTx Turboprops

Embraer Phenom 100 / 100E

Eclipse Aviation Eclipse 550

Cessna Citation Mustang 

Honda HondaJet 

Cessna Citation M2

Cessna Citation CJ1/CJ plus

Pilatus PC-12 NGX

Pilatus PC-24 

Pilatus PC-12 Turboprops

Nextant 400XT 

Legacy 450

Piaggio Avanti P180

Cessna Citation CJ2/CJ2 plus

Bombardier Learjet 40/ 40XR

Gulfstream G150

Beechcraft King Air 200 Turboprops

Hawker Beechcraft 750

Hawker Beechcraft Premier 1A

Hawker Beechcraft 400/ 400XP

Bombardier Learjet 60 / 60XR

Cessna Citation Encore plus

Embraer Phenom 300 / 300 E

Cessna Citation V

Cessna Citation Bravo

Cessna Citation II

Cessna Citation CJ3 / CJ3 plus

Cessna Citation CJ4

Bombardier Learjet 45 / 45XR

Cessna Citation VII

Cessna Citation Sovereign 

Embraer Legacy 500

Beechcraft King Air 350i

Embraer Praetor 500

Dassault Falcon 50 / 50 EX

Hawker Beechcraft 4000

Hawker Beechcraft 1000

Gulfstream G280

Hawker Beechcraft 850XP

Hawker 800 series

Cessna Citation X

Gulfstream G200

Beechjet 400 A

Hawker Beechcraft 900XP

Bombardier Challenger 300

Cessna Citation Latitude

Cessna Citation XLS/XLS plus

Bombardier Learjet 75

Bombardier Challenger 350

Cessna Citation III

Embraer Praetor 600

Dassault Falcon 2000S

Dassault Falcon 2000

Dassault Falcon 2000XLS

Dassault Falcon 2000EX

Bombardier Challenger 605

Bombardier Challenger 604

Dassault Falcon 2000LX

Dassault Falcon 900LX

Bombardier Challenger 650

Dassault Falcon 7X

Dassault Falcon 6X

Dassault Falcon 900C

Dassault Falcon 900DX

Embraer Legacy 650 / 650E

Gulfstream 350

Gulfstream GIV

Gulfstream GIV-SP

Dassault Falcon 900EX

Dassault Falcon 900EX EASy

Gulfstream GIII

Bombardier Challenger 850

Bombardier Challenger 5000

Legacy 600

Bombardier Global 6000

Embraer Lineage 1000 VIP

Gulfstream G500

Gulfstream G550

Gulfstream 650

Fairchild Dornier 328

Dassault Falcon 900B

Gulfstream GV

Gulfstream G450

Dassault Falcon 8X

Bombardier Global 5500

Bombardier Global 6500

Airbus ACJ318

Fairchild Metro 23

Airbus ACJ319

Boeing Business Jet BBJ 3

Boeing Business Jet BBJ 2

Gulfstream 700

Dornier 228

Airbus ACJ30

Dornier 328

Saab 340

Boeing BBJ

Fokker 50

Embraer ERJ 145

References 

Civil aviation